Oscar Thore Hedvall (born 9 August 1998) is a Danish professional footballer who plays for FC Fredericia on loan from Silkeborg IF.

References

Living people
1998 births
Association football goalkeepers
Danish men's footballers
Silkeborg IF players
FC Fredericia players
Danish Superliga players
People from Silkeborg
Danish 1st Division players
Sportspeople from the Central Denmark Region